VfB Oldenburg is a German association football club based in Oldenburg, Lower Saxony. In the 2022–23 season, they play in the 3. Liga, the third level of football in Germany.

History

Founded by a group of high school boys as FC 1897 Oldenburg on 17 October 1897, they merged with FV Germania 1903 Oldenburg in 1919 and adopted their current name. Their interests were football, cricket and track. Within a year the club acquired an old velodrome in Donnerschwee – part of the town of Oldenburg today – and converted it to a football ground.

The club played for two seasons in the Gauliga Weser-Ems (I), just before the end of the war, from 1942 to 1944.

After again restoring their ground in the aftermath of World War II, the club was able to pick up play in the Oberliga Nord in the 1949–50 season, but immediately found themselves relegated to tier II. They made another single season appearance in the upper league in 1955–56, before returning for a run of three seasons from 1960 to 1963 in the lead up to the formation of the Bundesliga, Germany's new professional football league. Oldenburg did not qualify for the new circuit and found themselves in the Regionalliga Nord (II). They played at that level until the mid-1970s when they slipped into the Amateur Oberliga Nord (III).

They enjoyed their highest league finish in 1991–92. They finished bottom of the third level in 1999–2000, and came close to being dissolved due to financial problems. After a decade of lower division play following relegation from the Regionalliga Nord in 2000, the club returned to this level in 2012 and played there until they were promoted to the 3. Liga in 2022 by beating BFC Dynamo in a promotion play-off.

Stadium
Since 1991 VfB Oldenburg has been playing in the Marschweg-Stadion, which was opened in 1951. It has a capacity of 15,200, of which 4,500 are seats and 10,700 standing places. Its record attendance of 32,000 was achieved before reconstruction.

Local derby rivalry
VfB Oldenburg has a local derby rivalry with VfL Oldenburg.

Players

Current squad

Players out on loan

Honours
 German amateur championship
 Runners-up: 1988
  Niedersachsenliga West
 Champions: 1952, 1957, 1959, 2007 (V)
 Niedersachsenliga
 Champions: 1972, 2009 (V)
 Oberliga Nord (III)
 Champions: 1975, 1980, 1990
 Regionalliga Nord
 Champions: 1996 (III), 2022 (IV)
 Oberliga Niedersachsen/Bremen
 Champions: 2002 (IV)

References

External links
 

 
Football clubs in Germany
Football clubs in Lower Saxony
Association football clubs established in 1897
1897 establishments in Germany
2. Bundesliga clubs
VfB